Filipino Americans are Americans of Filipino ancestry. Filipinos and other Asian ethnicities in North America were first documented in the 16th century as slaves and prisoners on ships sailing to and from New Spain (Mexico) and a handful of inhabitants in other minute settlements during the time Louisiana was an administrative district of the Viceroyalty of New Spain (Mexico). Mass migration did not begin until the 20th century, when the Philippines was a U.S. territory.

As of 2019, there were 4.2 million Filipinos, or Americans with Filipino ancestry, in the United States with large communities in California, Hawaii, Illinois, Texas, and the New York metropolitan area.

Terminology
The term Filipino American is sometimes shortened to Fil-Am or Pinoy. Another term which has been used is Philippine Americans. The earliest appearance of the term Pinoy (feminine Pinay), was in a 1926 issue of the Filipino Student Bulletin. Some Filipinos believe that the term Pinoy was coined by Filipinos who came to the United States to distinguish themselves from Filipinos living in the Philippines. Beginning in 2017, started by individuals who identify with the LGBT+ Filipino American population, there is an effort to adopt the term FilipinX; this new term has faced opposition within the broader overseas Filipino diaspora, within the Philippines, and in the United States, with some who are in opposition believing it is an attempt of a "colonial imposition".

Background, demographics, and socioeconomics

History

Filipino slaves and crew members were some of were the first Asians in North America. The first documented presence of Filipinos in what is now the United States dates back to October 1587 when Novohispanic ships loaded with slave workers and some prisoners docked around Morro Bay, California with the first permanent settlement in Louisiana in 1763, where they were called "Manilamen" and at least one served in the Battle of New Orleans during the closing stages of the War of 1812. and a few Filipinos worked as ranch hands in the western U.S. Mass migration began in the early 20th century when, for a period following the 1898 Treaty of Paris, the Philippines was a territory of the United States. By 1904, Filipino peoples of different ethnic backgrounds were imported by the US government onto the Americas and were displayed at the Louisiana Purchase Exposition as part of a human zoo. During the 1920s, many Filipinos immigrated to the United States as unskilled labor, to provide better opportunities for their families back at home.

Philippine independence was recognized by the United States on July 4, 1946. After independence in 1946, Filipino American numbers continued to grow. Immigration was reduced significantly during the 1930s, except for those who served in the United States Navy, and increased following immigration reform in the 1960s. The majority of Filipinos who immigrated after the passage of the Immigration and Nationality Act of 1965 were skilled professionals and technicians.

General demographics

The 2010 census counted 3.4 million Filipino Americans; the United States Department of State in 2011 estimated the total at 4 million, or 1.1% of the U.S. population. They are the country's second largest self-reported Asian ancestry group according to 2010 American Community Survey. They are also the largest population of Overseas Filipinos. Significant populations of Filipino Americans can be found in California, Hawaii, the New York metropolitan area and Illinois.

Wealth

A 2019 census conducted by Pew Research Center showed that Filipino Americans have a higher level of educational attainment and income than the national average. Filipino Americans show a higher rate of home ownership compared to the average for all Asian Americans. As of 2014, 18% of Filipino American households belonged to the top 10% household income distribution. As of 2018, Filipino Americans hold the spot for the second highest median household income. Among all Asians, Filipino Americans show the lowest poverty rate at 7% after Indian Americans at 6%.

Around 47% of Filipino Americans hold management or professional jobs. A demographic study of physicians and nurses in the U.S. released in 1998 showed that Filipino American doctors were the second most numerous subgroup among Asian doctors: There were 1,680 Filipino American doctors per 100,000 persons. The study also showed that Filipino nurses, whether foreign or American-born, had the highest median income among any other ethnicity.

Culture
The history of native Filipino peoples, Chinese immigration waves, and Spanish and American rule, plus contact with merchants and traders from many areas culminated in a unique blend of cultures in the Philippines. Filipino American cultural identity has been described as fluid, adopting aspects from various cultures; that said, there has not been significant research into the culture of Filipino Americans. Fashion, dance, music, theater and arts have all had roles in building Filipino American cultural identities and communities.

In areas of sparse Filipino population, they often form loosely-knit social organizations aimed at maintaining a "sense of family", which is a key feature of Filipino culture. These organizations generally arrange social events, especially of a charitable nature, and keep members up-to-date with local events. Organizations are often organized into regional associations. The associations are a small part of Filipino American life. Filipino Americans formed close-knit neighborhoods, notably in California and Hawaii. A few communities have "Little Manilas", civic and business districts tailored for the Filipino American community. In a Filipino party, shoes should be left in front of the house and greet everyone with a hi or hello. When greeting the elderly, 'po' and 'opo' must be said in every sentence to show respect.

Some Filipinos have traditional Philippine surnames, such as Bacdayan or Macapagal, while others have surnames derived from Japanese, Indian, and Chinese and reflect centuries of trade with these merchants preceding European and American rule. Reflecting Spanish rule and the Claveria Decree of 1849, most Filipinos adopted Hispanic surnames, and celebrate fiestas, but the view that Filipinos may be Hispanic is not universally accepted. The Philippines experienced both Spanish and American colonial territorial status, with its population seen through each nation's racial constructs. In a 2017 Pew Research Survey, only 1% of immigrants from the Philippines identified as Hispanic. Many Filipinos choose to identify as Pacific Islander, while others identify as Asian Americans.

Due to history, the Philippines and the United States are connected culturally. In 2016, there was $16.5 billion worth of trade between the two countries, with the United States being the largest foreign investor in the Philippines, and more than 40% of remittances came from (or through) the United States. In 2004, the amount of remittances coming from the United States was $5 billion; this is an increase from the $1.16 billion sent in 1991 (then about 80% of total remittances being sent to the Philippines), and the $324 million sent in 1988. Some Filipino Americans have chosen to retire in the Philippines, buying real estate. Filipino Americans continue to travel back and forth between the United States and the Philippines, making up more than a tenth of all foreign travelers to the Philippines in 2010; when traveling back to the Philippines they often bring cargo boxes known as a balikbayan box.

Language

Filipino and English are constitutionally established as official languages in the Philippines, and Filipino is designated as the national language, with English in wide use. Many Filipinos speak American English due to American colonial influence in the country's education system and due to limited Spanish education. Among Asian Americans in 1990, Filipino Americans had the smallest percentage of individuals who had problems with English. In 2000, among U.S.-born Filipino Americans, three quarters responded that English is their primary language; nearly half of Filipino Americans speak English exclusively.

In 2003, Tagalog was the fifth most-spoken language in the United States, with 1.262 million speakers; by 2011, it was the fourth most-spoken language in the United States. Tagalog usage is significant in California, Nevada, and Washington, while Ilocano usage is significant in Hawaii. Many of California's public announcements and documents are translated into Tagalog. Tagalog is also taught in some public schools in the United States, as well as at some colleges. Other significant Filipino languages are Ilocano and Cebuano. Other languages spoken in Filipino American households include Pangasinan, Kapampangan, Hiligaynon, Bicolano, Chavacano, and Waray. However, fluency in Philippine languages tends to be lost among second- and third-generation Filipino Americans. Other languages of the community include Spanish and Chinese (Hokkien). The demonym Filipinx is a gender-neutral term that is applied only to those of Filipino heritage in the diaspora, specifically Filipino-Americans. The term is not applied to Filipinos in the Philippines.

Religion

The Philippines is 90% Christian, one of only two predominantly Christian countries in Southeast Asia, along with East Timor. Following the European arrival to the Philippines by Ferdinand Magellan, Spaniards made a concerted effort to convert Filipinos to Catholicism; outside of the Muslim sultanates and animist societies, missionaries were able to convert large numbers of Filipinos. and the majority are Roman Catholic, giving Catholicism a major impact on Filipino culture. Other Christian denominations include Protestants (Aglipayan, Episcopalian, and others), and nontrinitarians (Iglesia ni Cristo and Jehovah's Witnesses). Additionally there are those Filipinos who are Muslims, Buddhist or nonreligious; religion has served as a dividing factor within the Philippines and Filipino American communities.

During the early part of the United States governance in the Philippines, there was a concerted effort to convert Filipinos into Protestants, and the results came with varying success. As Filipinos began to migrate to the United States, Filipino Roman Catholics were often not embraced by their American Catholic brethren, nor were they sympathetic to a Filipino-ized Catholicism, in the early 20th century. This led to creation of ethnic-specific parishes; one such parish was St. Columban's Church in Los Angeles. In 1997, the Filipino oratory was dedicated at the Basilica of the National Shrine of the Immaculate Conception, owing to increased diversity within the congregations of American Catholic parishes. The first-ever American Church for Filipinos, San Lorenzo Ruiz Church in New York City, is named after the first saint from the Philippines, San Lorenzo Ruiz. This was officially designated as a church for Filipinos in July 2005, the first in the United States, and the second in the world, after a church in Rome.

In 2010, Filipino American Catholics were the largest population of Asian American Catholics, making up more than three fourths of Asian American Catholics. In 2015, a majority (65%) of Filipino Americans identify as Catholic; this is down slightly from 2004 (68%). Filipino Americans, who are first generation immigrants were more likely to attend mass weekly, and tended to be more conservative, than those who were born in the United States. Culturally, some traditions and beliefs rooted from the original indigenous religions of Filipinos are still known among the Filipino diaspora.

Cuisine

The number of Filipino restaurants does not reflect the size of the population. Due to the restaurant business not being a major source of income for the community, few non-Filipinos are familiar with the cuisine. Although American cuisine influenced Filipino cuisine, it has been criticized by non-Filipinos. Even on Oahu where there is a significant Filipino American population, Filipino cuisine is not as noticeable as other Asian cuisines. One study found that Filipino cuisine was not often listed in Food frequency questionnaires. On television, Filipino cuisine has been criticized, such as on Fear Factor, and praised, such as on Anthony Bourdain: No Reservations, and Bizarre Foods America.

Filipino American chefs cook in many fine dining restaurants, including Cristeta Comerford who is the executive chef in the White House, though many do not serve Filipino cuisine in their restaurants. Reasons given for the lack of Filipino cuisine in the U.S. include colonial mentality, lack of a clear identity, a preference for cooking at home and a continuing preference of Filipino Americans for cuisines other than their own. Filipino cuisine remains prevalent among Filipino immigrants, with restaurants and grocery stores catering to the Filipino American community, including Jollibee, a Philippines-based fast food chain.

In the 2010s, successful and critically reviewed Filipino American restaurants were featured in The New York Times. That same decade began a Filipino Food movement in the United States; it has been criticized for gentrification of the cuisine. Bon Appetit named Bad Saint in Washington, D.C. "the second best new restaurant in the United States" in 2016. Food & Wine named Lasa, in Los Angeles, one of its restaurants of the year in 2018. With this emergence of Filipino American restaurants, food critics like Andrew Zimmern have predicted that Filipino food will be "the next big thing" in American cuisine. Yet in 2017, Vogue described the cuisine as "misunderstood and neglected"; SF Weekly in 2019, later described the cuisine as "marginal, underappreciated, and prone to weird booms-and-busts".

Family 
Filipino Americans undergo experiences that are unique to their own identities. These experiences derive from both the Filipino culture and American cultures individually and the dueling of these identities as well. These stressors, if great enough, can lead Filipino Americans into suicidal behaviors. Members of the Filipino community learn early on about kapwa, which is defined as “interpersonal connectedness or togetherness.”

With kapwa, many Filipino Americans have a strong sense of needing to repay their family members for the opportunities that they have been able to receive. An example of this is a new college graduate feeling the need to find a job that will allow them to financially support their family and themselves. This notion comes from “utang na loob,” defined as a debt that must be repaid to those who have supported the individual.

With kapwa and utang na loob as strong forces enacting on the individual, there is an “all or nothing” mentality that is being played out. In order to bring success back to one's family, there is a desire to succeed for one's family through living out a family's wants as opposed to one's own true desires. This can manifest as one entering a career path that they are not passionate in, but select in order to help support their family.

Despite many of the stressors for these students deriving from family, it also becomes apparent that these are the reasons that these students are resilient. When family conflict rises in Filipino American families, there is a negative association with suicide attempts. This suggests that though family is a presenting stressor in a Filipino American's life, it also plays a role for their resilience. In a study conducted by Yusuke Kuroki, family connectedness, whether defined as positive or negative to each individual, served as one means of lowering suicide attempts.

Media
The growth of publications for the masses in the Philippines accelerated during the American period. Ethnic media serving Filipino Americans dates back to the beginning of the 20th Century. In 1905, pensionados at University of California, Berkeley published The Filipino Students' Magazine. One of the earliest Filipino American newspapers published in the United States, was the Philippine Independent of Salinas, California, which began publishing in 1921. Newspapers from the Philippines, to include The Manila Times, also served the Filipino diaspora in the United States. In 1961, the Philippine News was started by Alex Esclamado, which by the 1980s had a national reach and at the time was the largest English-language Filipino newspaper. While many areas with Filipino Americans have local Filipino newspapers, one of the largest concentrations of these newspapers occur in Southern California. Beginning in 1992, Filipinas began publication, and was unique in that it focused on American born Filipino Americans of the second and third generation. Filipinas ended its run in 2010, however it was succeeded by Positively Filipino in 2012 which included some of the staff from Filipinas. The Filipino diaspora in the United States are able to watch programming from the Philippines on television through GMA Pinoy TV and The Filipino Channel.

Politics

Filipino Americans have traditionally been socially conservative, particularly with "second wave" immigrants; the first Filipino American elected to office was Peter Aduja. In the 2004 U.S. presidential election Republican president George W. Bush won the Filipino American vote over John Kerry by nearly a two-to-one ratio, which followed strong support in the 2000 election. However, during the 2008 U.S. presidential election, Filipino Americans voted majority Democratic, with 50% to 58% of the community voting for President Barack Obama and 42% to 46% voting for Senator John McCain. The 2008 election marked the first time that a majority of Filipino Americans voted for a Democratic presidential candidate.

According to the 2012 National Asian American Survey, conducted in September 2012, 45% of Filipinos were independent or nonpartisan, 27% were Republican, and 24% were Democrats. Additionally, Filipino Americans had the largest proportions of Republicans among Asian Americans who have been polled, a position which is normally held by Vietnamese Americans, leading up to the 2012 election, and had the lowest job approval opinion of Obama among Asian Americans. In a survey of Asian Americans from thirty seven cities conducted by the Asian American Legal Defense and Education Fund, it found that of the Filipino American respondents, 65% of them voted for Obama. According to an exit poll conducted by the Asian American Legal Defense and Education Fund, it found that 71% of responding Filipino Americans voted for Hillary Clinton during the 2016 general election.

In a survey which was conducted by Asian Americans Advancing Justice in September 2020, of the 263 Filipino American respondents, 46% of them identified themselves as Democrats, 28% of them identified themselves as Republicans, and 16% of them identified themselves as independents. According to interviews which were conducted by Anthony Ocampo, an academic, Filipino American supporters of Donald Trump cited their support for the former President based on their support for the building of a border wall, their support for tax cuts to businesses, their support for legal immigration, their belief in school choice, their opposition to LGBTQ rights, their opposition to abortion, their opposition to affirmative action, their antagonism towards the People's Republic of China, and their belief that Trump is not a racist. There was an age divide among Filipino Americans, with older Filipino Americans more likely to support Trump or be Republicans, while younger and US-born Filipino Americans were more likely to support Biden or be Democrats. In the 2020 presidential election, Philippine Ambassador Jose Manuel Romualdez alleges that 60% of Filipino Americans reportedly voted for Joe Biden. A Filipino American was among those who participated in the 2021 United States Capitol attack. Rappler alleges that the Filipino American media has heavily repeated QAnon conspiracies. Rappler further alleges that, many Filipino Americans who voted for Trump, and adhere to QAnon, cite similar political leanings in the Philippines with regard to Philippine President Rodrigo Duterte, and anti-Chinese sentiment because China has been building artificial reefs in the South China Sea near the Philippines in the 2010s and as a result, they have recently seen the Republican Party as being more hardline with regard to the Chinese government's actions. Also Filipino Americans have a high rate of gun ownership in the United States, and are the most pro-gun minority group in the U.S. 

Due to scattered living patterns, it is nearly impossible for Filipino American candidates to win an election solely based on the Filipino American vote. Filipino American politicians have increased their visibility over the past few decades. Ben Cayetano (Democrat), former governor of Hawaii, became the first governor of Filipino descent in the United States. The number of Congressional members of Filipino descent doubled to numbers not reached since 1937, two when the Philippine Islands were represented by non-voting Resident Commissioners, due to the 2000 Senatorial Election. In 2009 three Congress-members claimed at least one-eighth Filipino ethnicity; the largest number to date. Since the resignation of Senator John Ensign in 2011 (the only Filipino American to have been a member of the Senate), and Representative Steve Austria (the only Asian Pacific American Republican in the 112th Congress) choosing not to seek reelection and retire, Representative Robert C. Scott was the only Filipino American in the 113th Congress. In the 116th United States Congress, Scott was joined by Rep. TJ Cox, bringing the number of Filipino Americans in Congress to two. In the 117th United States Congress, Scott once again became the sole Filipino-American Representative after Cox was defeated in a rematch against David Valadao.

Community matters

Immigration

The Citizenship Retention and Re-Acquisition Act of 2003 (Republic Act No. 9225) made Filipino Americans eligible for dual citizenship in the United States and the Philippines. Overseas suffrage was first employed in the May 2004 elections in which Philippine President Gloria Macapagal Arroyo was reelected to a second term.

By 2005, about 6,000 Filipino Americans had become dual citizens of the two countries. One effect of this act was to allow Filipino Americans to invest in the Philippines through land purchases, which are limited to Filipino citizens, and, with some limitations, former citizens.), vote in Philippine elections, retire in the Philippines, and participate in representing the Philippine flag. In 2013, for the Philippine general election there were 125,604 registered Filipino voters in the United States and Caribbean, of which only 13,976 voted.

Dual citizens have been recruited to participate in international sports events including athletes representing the Philippines who competed in the 2004 Olympic Games in Athens, and the Olympic Games in Beijing 2008.

The Philippine government actively encourages Filipino Americans to visit or return permanently to the Philippines via the "Balikbayan" program and to invest in the country.

Filipinos remain one of the largest immigrant groups to date with over 40,000 arriving annually since 1979. The United States Citizenship and Immigration Services (USCIS) has a preference system for issuing visas to non-citizen family members of U.S. citizens, with preference based generally on familial closeness. Some non-citizen relatives of U.S. citizens spend long periods on waiting lists. Petitions for immigrant visas, particularly for siblings of previously naturalized Filipinos that date back to 1984, were not granted until 2006. , over 380 thousand Filipinos were on the visa wait list, second only to Mexico and ahead of India, Vietnam and China. Filipinos have the longest waiting times for family reunification visas, as Filipinos disproportionately apply for family visas; this has led to visa petitions filed in July 1989 still waiting to be processed in March 2013.

Illegal immigration

It has been documented that Filipinos were among those naturalized due to the Immigration Reform and Control Act of 1986. In 2009, the Department of Homeland Security estimated that 270,000 Filipinos were "unauthorized immigrants". This was an increase of 70,000 from a previous estimate in 2000. In both years, Filipinos accounted for 2% of the total. , Filipinos were the fifth-largest community of illegal immigrants behind Mexico (6.65 million, 62%), El Salvador (530,000, 5%), Guatemala (480,000, 4%), and Honduras (320,000, 3%). In January 2011, the Department of Homeland Security estimate of "unauthorized immigrants" from the Philippines remained at 270,000. By 2017, the number of Filipinos who were in the United States illegally increased to 310,000. Filipinos who reside in the United States illegally are known within the Filipino community as "TnT's" (tago nang tago translated to "hide and hide").

Mental health

Identity

Filipino Americans may be mistaken for members of other racial/ethnic groups, such as Latinos or Pacific Islanders; this may lead to "mistaken" discrimination that is not specific to Asian Americans. Filipino Americans additionally, have had difficulty being categorized, termed by one source as being in "perpetual absence".

In the period, prior to 1946, Filipinos were taught that they were Americans, and they were also presented with an idealized image of America. They had official status as United States nationals. When they were ill-treated and discriminated against by other Americans, Filipinos were faced with the racism which existed during that period, which undermined these ideals. Carlos Bulosan later wrote about this experience in America is in the Heart. Even pensionados, who immigrated on government scholarships, were treated poorly.

In Hawaii, Filipino Americans often have little identification with their heritage, and it has been documented that many disclaim their ethnicity. This may be due to the "colonial mentality", or the idea that Western ideals and physical characteristics are superior to their own. Although categorized as Asian Americans, Filipino Americans have not fully embraced being part of this racial category due to marginalization by other Asian American groups and or the dominant American society. This created a struggle within Filipino American communities over how far to assimilate. The term "white-washed" has been applied to those who are seeking to assimilate further. Those who disclaim their ethnicity lose the positive adjustment to outcomes that are found in those who have a strong, positive, ethnic identity.

Of the ten largest immigrant groups, Filipino Americans have the highest rate of assimilation. with exception to the cuisine; Filipino Americans have been described as the most "Americanized" of the Asian American ethnicities. However, even though Filipino Americans are the second largest group among Asian Americans, community activists have described the ethnicity as "invisible", claiming that the group is virtually unknown to the American public, and is often not seen as significant even among its members. Another term for this status is forgotten minority.

Considering most people now, when they hear the word "assimilate," they almost automatically think of converting. Although many Filipinos migrate to America to start a "new life," they still carry over some negative norms (Wolf 476).

This description has also been used in the political arena, given the lack of political mobilization. In the mid-1990s it was estimated that some one hundred Filipino Americans have been elected or appointed to public office. This lack of political representation contributes to the perception that Filipino Americans are invisible.

The concept is also used to describe how the ethnicity has assimilated. Few affirmative action programs target the group although affirmative action programs rarely target Asian Americans in general. Assimilation was easier given that the group is majority religiously Christian, fluent in English, and have high levels of education. The concept was in greater use in the past, before the post-1965 wave of arrivals.

The term invisible minority has been used for Asian Americans as a whole, and the term "model minority" has been applied to Filipinos as well as other Asian American groups. Filipino critics allege that Filipino Americans are ignored in immigration literature and studies.

As with fellow Asian Americans, Filipino Americans are viewed as "perpetual foreigners", even for those born in the United States. This has resulted in physical attacks on Filipino Americans, as well as non-violent forms of discrimination.

In college and high school campuses, many Filipino American student organizations put on annual Pilipino Culture Nights to showcase dances, perform skits, and comment on the issues such as identity and lack of cultural awareness due to assimilation and colonization.

Filipino American gay, lesbian, transgender, and bisexual identities are often shaped by immigration status, generation, religion, and racial formation.

Veterans

During World War II, some 250,000 to 400,000 Filipinos served in the United States Military, in units including the Philippine Scouts, Philippine Commonwealth Army under U.S. Command, and recognized guerrillas during the Japanese Occupation. In January 2013, ten thousand surviving Filipino American veterans of World War II lived in the United States, and a further fourteen thousand in the Philippines, although some estimates found eighteen thousand or fewer surviving veterans.

The U.S. government promised these soldiers all of the benefits afforded to other veterans. However, in 1946, the United States Congress passed the Rescission Act of 1946 which stripped Filipino veterans of the promised benefits. One estimate claims that monies due to these veterans for back pay and other benefits exceeds one billion dollars. Of the sixty-six countries allied with the United States during the war, the Philippines is the only country that did not receive military benefits from the United States. The phrase "Second Class Veterans" has been used to describe their status.

Many Filipino veterans traveled to the United States to lobby Congress for these benefits. Since 1993, numerous bills have been introduced in Congress to pay the benefits, but all died in committee. As recently as 2018, these bills have received bipartisan support.

Representative Hanabusa submitted legislation to award Filipino Veterans with a Congressional Gold Medal. Known as the Filipino Veterans of World War II Congressional Gold Medal Act, it was referred to the Committee on Financial Services and the Committee on House Administration. As of February 2012 had attracted 41 cosponsors. In January 2017, the medal was approved.

There was a proposed lawsuit to be filed in 2011 by The Justice for Filipino American Veterans against the Department of Veterans Affairs.

In the late 1980s, efforts towards reinstating benefits first succeeded with the incorporation of Filipino veteran naturalization in the Immigration Act of 1990. Over 30,000 such veterans had immigrated, with mostly American citizens, receiving benefits relating to their service.

Similar language to those bills was inserted by the Senate into the American Recovery and Reinvestment Act of 2009 which provided a one time payment of at least 9,000 USD to eligible non-US Citizens and US$15,000 to eligible US Citizens via the Filipino Veterans Equity Compensation Fund. These payments went to those recognized as soldiers or guerrillas or their spouses. The list of eligibles is smaller than the list recognized by the Philippines. Additionally, recipients had to waive all rights to possible future benefits. As of March 2011, 42 percent (24,385) of claims had been rejected; By 2017, more than 22,000 people received about $226 million in one time payments.

In the 113th Congress, Representative Joe Heck reintroduced his legislation to allow documents from the Philippine government and the U.S. Army to be accepted as proof of eligibility. Known as H.R. 481, it was referred to the Committee on Veterans' Affairs. In 2013, the U.S. released a previously classified report detailing guerrilla activities, including guerrilla units not on the "Missouri list".

In September 2012, the Social Security Administration announced that non-resident Filipino World War II veterans were eligible for certain social security benefits; however an eligible veteran would lose those benefits if they visited for more than one month in a year, or immigrated.

Beginning in 2008, a bipartisan effort started by Mike Thompson and Tom Udall an effort began to recognize the contributions of Filipinos during World War 2; by the time Barack Obama signed the effort into law in 2016, a mere fifteen thousand of those veterans were estimated to be alive. Of those living Filipino veterans of World War II, there were an estimated 6,000 living in the United States. Finally in October 2017, the recognition occurred with the awarding of a Congressional Gold Medal. When the medal was presented by the Speaker of the United States House of Representatives, several surviving veterans were at the ceremony. The medal now resides in the National Museum of American History.

Holidays
Congress established Asian American and Pacific Islander Heritage Month in May to commemorate Filipino American and other Asian American cultures. Upon becoming the largest Asian American group in California, October was established as Filipino American History Month to acknowledge the first landing of Filipinos on October 18, 1587, in Morro Bay, California. It is widely celebrated by Fil-Ams.

Notable people

Footnotes

References

Further reading

 Melendy, H. Brett. "Filipino Americans." in Gale Encyclopedia of Multicultural America, edited by Thomas Riggs, (3rd ed., vol. 2, Gale, 2014), pp. 119–135. online

 Posades, Barbara M. The Filipino Americans (1999) excerpt 

Archive
 Cannery Workers and Farm Laborers Union, Local 7 Records , 1915–1985; Predominantly 1933–1982. 46.31 cubic feet. At the Labor Archives of Washington State, University of Washington Libraries Special Collections .
 Carlos Bulosan Papers, 1914–1976.  4.65 cubic feet, 17 microfilm reels. At the Labor Archives of Washington State, University of Washington Libraries Special Collections .
 Chris D. Mensalvas Papers, 1935–1974.  .25 cubic feet, 1 sound cassette. At the Labor Archives of Washington State, University of Washington Libraries Special Collections .
 Chris D. Mensalvas Photograph Collection, 1937–1956.  1 folder of photographic prints. At the Labor Archives of Washington State, University of Washington Libraries Special Collections .
 Trinidad Rojo Papers, 1923–1991.  2.81 cubic feet. At the Labor Archives of Washington State, University of Washington Libraries Special Collections .

External links

 
 
 
 
 
 
 

Asian-American society
Southeast Asian American
Filipino American
Filipino diaspora by country